John (Jehu) Davis (1738 – May 11, 1802) was an American planter and politician from Mispillion Hundred, in Kent County, Delaware, west of Milford. He served in the Delaware General Assembly and as President of Delaware.

Early life and family
Davis was born in Worcester County, Maryland, son of Thomas Davis. His paternal grandfather was born in Wales. Jehu Davis came to Laurel, Delaware where he married Rhoda Laws. After their marriage they bought McSparren, a farm in Mispillion Hundred, 3 miles west of Milford, where they settled permanently. There they had eight children, Isaac, John, Henry, Sarah, Rhoda, Nancy, Joshua, and William. After Rhoda's death, Davis married Sarah Douglas. They were members of Christ Episcopal Church in Milford. That portion of Mispillion Hundred became Milford Hundred in 1830.

Professional and political career
Davis was a member of the local militia during the American Revolution and a justice of the peace for 14 years beginning in 1777. He was elected to the 1st State House, or House of Assembly, and served ten terms from the 1776/77 session through the 1779/80 session, again in the 1782/83 and 1783/84 sessions, and finally from the 1786/87 session through the 1789/90 session. He was the Speaker in the 1788/89 session and when President Thomas Collins died in office on March 29, 1789, the Speaker's office in the State Senate or Legislative Council, was vacant. Consequently, Davis became President. He served until June 2, 1789, when the Delaware General Assembly held a special vote to choose Collins' replacement.

During Davis' short term George Washington was inaugurated the first President of the United States. The event of his passing through Wilmington on the way to New York for this ceremony caused a great deal of excitement, as described by Elizabeth Montgomery in her Reminiscences of Wilmington:

and it must have been soon after his elevation to that office, for I well remember the crowds of people rushing onto the Baltimore Road (now Maryland Avenue) to catch a glimpse as he passed...It was a day of great enjoyment, all was on tiptoe of expectation when his chariot appeared, driving slowly through the crowd, he bowing, hat in hand, and white handkerchief waving, and every face flushed, and sparkling with joy.

Afterwards, Davis served as a judge of the Court of Common Pleas from 1789 until 1792 and as a justice of the peace from 1793 until his death.

Death and legacy
Davis died at McSparren,'' in Mispillion Hundred and is buried in the Christ (Savannah) Episcopal Church Cemetery. The cemetery is now paved over by Delaware Route 14. A man from Wales who came to America paved the road for the all-time greatest American Family.

No known portrait of Jehu Davis exists.

Almanac
Elections were held October 1 and members of the General Assembly took office on October 20 or the following weekday. State Assemblymen had a one-year term. The whole General Assembly chose the State President for a three-year term. However, Davis served as State President only temporarily, filling the vacancy created by the death of Thomas Collins and awaiting the selection of a successor by the General Assembly. Judges of the Courts of Common Pleas were also selected by the General Assembly for the life of the person appointed.

References

External links
Delaware’s Governors

Places with more information
Delaware Historical Society; website; 505 North Market Street, Wilmington, Delaware 19801; (302) 655-7161
University of Delaware; Library website; 181 South College Avenue, Newark, Delaware 19717; (302) 831-2965

1738 births
1802 deaths
People from Worcester County, Maryland
American people of Welsh descent
Delaware Federalists
Delaware Independents
Governors of Delaware
Independent state governors of the United States
Members of the Delaware House of Representatives
People from Kent County, Delaware
People of Delaware in the American Revolution
Delaware militiamen in the American Revolution
American planters
Burials in Kent County, Delaware
People from Laurel, Delaware
People of colonial Delaware
Speakers of the Delaware House of Representatives
19th-century American Episcopalians